Carmel Head (Welsh: Trwyn y Gadair) is a prominent coastal headland on the northwest tip of the island of Anglesey.

It is a designated SSSI because of its geological interest for the Carmel Head Thrust fault where Precambrian rocks have been pushed over younger Ordovician rocks creating the Carmel Head thrust. Rock exposures along the cliffs of Carmel Head include Precambrian gneisses, which are almost certainly the oldest rocks in Wales.

Off-shore from the head lie the islands of the Skerries and to the east of the Skerries three further islands, West Mouse, Middle Mouse and East Mouse. On West Mouse is a large white-painted column which is matched on Carmel Head by two further columns, known locally as the "Three White Ladies". They were constructed in the 1860s as navigation aids: lining up the three columns marks the position of a shallow reef offshore that was a grave danger to shipping. There are ruins of a copper mine and factory still in existence, including a well-preserved furnace chimney stack.

In the summer months the Anglesey Coastal Path passes over Carmel Head on a permissive path but in winter the path is closed to all for pheasant shooting. Most of the land on the head, which peaks at 81 metres above sea level, is owned and managed by the National Trust.

References

Cylch-y-Garn
Headlands of Anglesey
Sites of Special Scientific Interest on Anglesey